Parliamentary elections were held in Estonia on 1 March 2015. Advance voting was held between 19 and 25 February with a turnout of 33 percent. The Reform Party remained the largest in the Riigikogu, winning 30 of the 101 seats. Its leader, Taavi Rõivas, remained Prime Minister.  The newly elected 101 members of the 13th Riigikogu assembled at Toompea Castle in Tallinn within ten days of the election.

Background
This was the first election since the resignation of Prime Minister Andrus Ansip, who relinquished his position after holding the office for almost nine years.  Following the resignation, a new coalition comprising the Estonian Reform Party and the Estonian Social Democrats were authorized to form a new government on 24 March 2014  with 34-year-old Taavi Rõivas as the new Prime Minister. This replaced the prior coalition of the Estonian Reform Party and the Pro Patria and Res Publica Union.

Electoral system
The 101 members of the Riigikogu were elected by proportional representation in twelve multi-member constituencies. The seats were allocated using a modified D'Hondt method. Parties had to pass a nationwide threshold of 5%, but if the number of votes cast for an individual candidate exceeded or equalled the simple quota (obtained by dividing the number of valid votes cast in the electoral district by the number of mandates in the district), they were elected.

Seats by electoral district

Opinion polls
Poll results are listed in the table below in reverse chronological order, showing the most recent first. The highest percentage figure in each poll is displayed in bold, and the background shaded in the leading party's color. In the instance that there is a tie, then no figure is shaded.

Results

Aftermath
The Reform Party started coalition talks with the Social Democrats, Pro Patria and Res Publica Union (IRL) and the Free Party. After nearly three weeks of negotiations, the Free Party left the coalition talks due to disagreements with the Reform Party and the IRL. The three remaining parties signed the coalition treaty on 8 April, and the cabinet took office on 9 April.

See also
Members of the 13th Riigikogu

References

External links
Estonian National Electoral Committee 
Poll ratings of political parties Eesti Erakondade Ajalugu 

Parliamentary elections in Estonia
Estonia
Parliamentary election